The Serbian Cultural Society "Prosvjeta" (abbreviated: SKD "Prosvjeta" or ) in Zagreb, Croatia is an independent, non-governmental cultural and scientific organization that takes special responsibility for promoting culture of and among Serbs in Croatia. Its primary aim is preservation and development of national identity of Serbs in Croatia.

The association was established on 18 November 1944 under the auspices of the State Anti-fascist Council for the National Liberation of Croatia in the period of World War II in Yugoslavia when Serb community was faced with the Genocide of Serbs in the Independent State of Croatia. It's work was interrupted in 1971 when together with Matica hrvatska it was forbidden under the accusations of promotion of nationalism after which it remained closed until 1993. Contemporary association defines it's guiding principles to be multiculturalism and interculturalism, as well as cultural awareness among diverse groups of citizens. In accordance with its understanding of national identity of Serbs in Croatia, Prosvjeta approaches its cultural activities while keeping in mind that Serb culture is a part of Croatian culture and a part of the Serb people's culture as a whole.

History

Establishment
Prosvjeta was established on 18 November 1944 in the period of World War II in Yugoslavia in the town of Glina. First president of the association was professor Dane Medaković from Zagreb. It was established as one among few new Serb institutions, first of which was Serb MP's club of the State Anti-fascist Council for the National Liberation of Croatia. As the expectation of the Allied and Yugoslav Partisans victory in war grew, Communist Party of Yugoslavia wanted to satisfy requests by Prečani Serbs population in the future Federal People's Republic of Yugoslavia who were the primary target of quisling Ustaše Genocide of Serbs in the Independent State of Croatia. Prečani Serbs initially constituted a significant majority, and towards the end of the war large segment of the entire Partisan forces, while in 1945 they also constituted 43% of membership of the Communist Party of Croatia. Primary task of the new organization in the initial period was to fight illiteracy in rural areas. Other ambitious plans included intention to establishm the future Museum of Serbs of Croatia, central library, student dormitory as well as to develop cooperation with Croatian Writers' Association, Croatian Painters' Association, Music Association and Association for Cultural Cooperation with Soviet Union.

Maspok period and 1971 closure
During the Croatian Spring (Maspok), a political conflict that took place from 1967 to 1971 in the Socialist Republic of Croatia, SKD Prosvjeta came to the forefront of Croatian Serb nationalist discourse. A plan put forward by SKH reformists to revise elementary and middle school literature and history curricula so 75 percent of the coverage would be on Croatian topics drew complaints from SKD Prosvjeta, which argued that the plan was a threat to Serb cultural rights. SKD Prosvjeta also objected to the SKH's attempts to reinterpret the wartime Partisan struggle as a liberation of Croatian nationality within the Yugoslav framework. By 1971, SKD Prosvjeta demanded that the Serbian language and Cyrillic script be officially used in Croatia alongside the Croatian language and Latin script, as well as legislative safeguards guaranteeing the national equality of Serbs. SKD Prosvjeta rejected the federal model advocated by the ZAVNOH and the SKH, arguing that nationalism was no longer needed in Yugoslavia. Furthermore, SKD Prosvjeta denounced the work of Matica hrvatska and asserted that the Serbs of Croatia would preserve their national identity by relying on Serbia's help regardless of the borders of the republics.

Finally, SKD Prosvjeta's Rade Bulat demanded the establishment of an autonomous province for the Croatian Serbs, and there were calls to grant autonomy for Dalmatia as well. The SKH central committee declared that no region of Croatia could make any legitimate claim to autonomy of any kind and labeled calls for regional Dalmatian autonomy as treason to the Croatian nation. Such responses were in line with the SKH's objective of national homogenisation. To that end, the SKH blocked the option of declaring one's ethnic identity as regional in the 1971 census. In 1971, after Maspok, organization work was suspended together with work of Matica hrvatska. Initiative for reactivation of Prosvjeta work came in 1990, and it was implemented in 1993.

Central Library of Serbs of Croatia

In 1996 the Central Library of Serbs of Croatia was established. This library operates as a central national library of Serbs of Croatia (one of 10 central ethnic community libraries in Croatia) financed by Ministry of Culture . Its task is to obtain, process and disseminate Serbian library materials and to inform the public.

Library history

Prosvjeta began its first library activities during World War II in Yugoslavia within Yugoslav Partisans. On January 4, 1948 Prosvjeta established its first central library in Zagreb as a capital of People's Republic of Croatia. At that time the library possessed 40,000 books and publications. In 1953 a decision was made to close the library. Its stock was deposited in Museum of Serbs of Croatia, National and University Library in Zagreb and Yugoslav Academy of Sciences and Arts.

During the period of the Socialist Federal Republic of Yugoslavia until the beginning of the Breakup of Yugoslavia there were no initiatives for special libraries for Serbs of Croatia since general libraries had an adequate number of titles from Serbian literature. In the years before, during and after the Croatian War of Independence inter-ethnic relations in Croatia were significantly disrupted. This, among other things, resulted in the mass removal and destruction of literature that conflicting sides considered inappropriate or subversive.

In 1995 Prosvjeta as its main annual priority declared the establishment of the library, which was opened the day before Saint Sava day, on 26. January 1996. In its initial stock the library had 6,200 books, most of those from city libraries. The initial idea of the Government Office for Minorities was to place the central library for Serbs of Croatia in the village of Gomirje where Gomirje Monastery was placed but since Prosvjeta took the initiative the library was finally placed in Zagreb. In the following years the library took about 15,000 Serbian literature titles from city libraries in Zagreb and Zagreb County. In this way, titles from that area were protected from recycling. Some of the titles were also sent to local committees and institutions like Gymnasium Vukovar.

Activities

Drama Studio "EHO"
Drama Studio "EHO" was founded in 2002 and today operates under the supervision of actress Svetlana Patafta.

Ensemble of Folk Dances Vukovar

Rijeka Subcommittee Gallery

Prosvjeta Publishing House
Prosvjeta Publishing House has two bookstores in Zagreb, one of them at Petar Preradović Square.

Prosvjeta

Bijela Pčela

Artefakti

Register of Serb cultural heritage in Croatia

Summer Schools

Subcommittees

Prosvjeta has sub-committees in the following settlements in Croatia

See also
 Vojin Jelić
 Prosvita

Sources

References

Serbian minority institutions and organizations in Croatia
Cultural organizations based in Croatia
Libraries in Croatia
Ethnic libraries
Libraries established in 1948
Libraries established in 1996
Donji grad, Zagreb
Ethnic organizations based in Yugoslavia